Brandon Maxwell (born September 18, 1984) is an American fashion designer, television personality, director, and photographer. He is the founder and creative director of Brandon Maxwell, the luxury women’s ready-to-wear label.

Early life and education 

Maxwell was born in Longview, Texas. His grandmother worked at a boutique in Longview, where he often spent his time. Growing up, Maxwell would put together outfits and photograph his friends wearing them. For high school, he attended Trinity School of Texas in Longview. In 2002, he moved to New York City to study painting at Marymount Manhattan College before graduating from St. Edward's University in Austin, Texas. Maxwell graduated with a Bachelor of Arts degree in photocommunications. After graduating, Maxwell returned to New York City to begin working.

Career 
Prior to launching his eponymous womenswear label, Maxwell entered the fashion industry as a stylist. He began assisting Deborah Afshani in 2009, followed by Nicola Formichetti in 2010, where he was introduced to Lady Gaga, as Nicola was her stylist at the time. In 2012, Maxwell took on the role of Lady Gaga’s fashion director.

Maxwell has styled for magazines such as Harper’s Bazaar, ELLE, V, Teen Vogue, and Porter. He has done ad campaigns for Barneys New York and Uniqlo. He was cited by The Hollywood Reporter as one of the top 25 stylists of 2015. Maxwell has collaborated with photographers such as Mario Testino, Inez & Vinoodh, Paola Kudacki, Giampaolo Sgura, Terry Richardson, and Steven Klein.
In 2015, Maxwell débuted his women's ready-to-wear label, Brandon Maxwell, in New York at Mr. Chow. The brand was born out of the desire to make women feel beautiful, sophisticated, and powerful by creating timeless garments that are impeccably tailored. With a focus on craftsmanship, the entire collection is designed in New York City. Brandon’s integrity is present throughout the process; he crafts his garments by draping, rather than sketching, to ensure an ideal fit. Inspiration is drawn from the women whom Brandon surrounds himself with, which is evident in the sharp tailoring and the sculptural details.

While attending St. Edward's University, Maxwell met friend and collaborator, Jessy Price. Together, Brandon and Jessy photographed and directed their first commercial short film together for the Brandon Maxwell Fall/Winter 2016 campaign. The success of this project lead them to directing Apple Music’s commercial for Lady Gaga’s song “A-Yo” from her 2016 album, Joanne. They have continued to direct campaigns for Brandon's eponymous label that focus on highlighting the featured talent.

Maxwell revealed his spring 2019 collection, inspired by his fascination with cowboy culture and picturesque landscapes of the American Southwest. Maxwell generated the highest earned media value during New York Fashion Week the week following his show, ahead of Ralph Lauren and Tom Ford.

Brandon Maxwell released his Fall/Winter 2019 Collection, returning to a fundamental palette of black after a splash of colors in the last collection, the Fall Winter 2019 runway show was held in an intimate and minimalist room at the Pennsylvania Hotel, so that the clothes would be the central focus. The collection is primarily in black and white with accents of apple green and bright rose to complement. The runway show began with a number of day wear pieces and then transitioned into evening wear, finishing in a dramatic fashion with a simple, yet elegant, billowing silk ball gown.

Brandon Maxwell dressed Lady Gaga for the 2019 MET Gala.

Michelle Obama, Karlie Kloss, Jennifer Lawrence, Oprah Winfrey, Nicole Kidman, Jane Fonda, Viola Davis, Queen Rania of Jordan, and Kerry Washington, among many others, wear Maxwell's brand. The collection is sold in retail stores around the world, including Saks, Bergdorf Goodman, Moda Operandi, Harvey Nichols, Harrods, and Neiman Marcus. 
Maxwell was awarded the 2020 AAFA Designer of the Year Award, 2019 Council of Fashion Designers of America (CFDA) Award for Womenswear, the 2019 FGI Fashion Star Award, the 2019 Texas Medal of Art Award, the 2018 Woolmark New York Semifinal Prize Award, the 2016 Fashion Group International Rising Star Award for Womenswear, the 2016 the CFDA Swarovski Award for Womenswear, and was named a finalist for the 2016 LVMH Prize.

Maxwell has appeared as a judge on the 2019 re-launch of Project Runway on Bravo TV.

In 2021, Maxwell was named Creative Director for two “elevated” fashion brands for Walmart. In this role, Maxwell oversees four seasonal collections annually for the labels, Free Assembly and Scoop.

References

External links 
 Ebony, 2017.
 Fall/Winter 2016 Campaign, 2016.

1984 births
Living people
American fashion designers
21st-century American photographers
People from Longview, Texas
American music video directors
St. Edward's University alumni